Michael "Hoggy" Hogben (born 6 November 1952) is an English auctioneer, antiques dealer, Author and TV personality who has appeared in the BBC series Bargain Hunt, ITV's Dickinson's Real Deal, and his own series Auction Man.

Early life
Born in Foord Road in Folkestone, Kent, Hogben's mother died when he was five leaving him and his brother with their father. Hogben purposefully failed his Eleven-plus examination to attend the same school as his brother.

After both brothers graduated from school, Hogben's father emigrated to Australia leaving the two boys to fend for themselves. Hogben left school at 15 and two years later came into a small inheritance, which he invested in opening a fashion boutique called "Mickey Finn". Over the next ten years he expanded with outlets throughout Kent.

Hogben then sold the fashion chain, and invested in Kent's first wine bar – McCartney's – in Dover. Having studied art, in 1988 he opened his own auction house in Folkestone, which then traded until he sold it in 2004. In 2013 Michael and his wife Lesley opened Westenhanger Auction Galleries, an auction house offering eight specialist auctions per year.

Television
Hogben became a Bargain Hunt expert when four of the earliest shows visited his auction rooms to sell contestant's items. The producer liked Hogben's style and he was offered a position. Hogben said yes, but in his first show declared a pair of Art Deco vases Art Nouveau. Hogben holds the record for the largest profit on a single item on "Bargain Hunt", when a team he led purchased a Royal Worcester box at Ardingly Fair for £140, then made £800 in a live auction shown on BBC One.

After screen testing for "Flog It!" for the BBC, Hogben decided against presenting in favour of his business. His style made him a choice for his own show, which was created with the BBC series Auction Man. Focusing on his auction rooms, the show demonstrates how the auction room works, focusing mainly on Michael and his family, and staff . The show also includes viewers' tips on spotting auction bargains, as well as celebrities, sharp customers and the unscrupulous dealers. The show ran for two series.

Hogben currently appears on his friend David Dickinson's ITV 1 show Dickinson's Real Deal.

Personal life
Hogben and his long term partner Lesley married in 2000 after living together for a long time;  the comedian Vic Reeves was best man.
Michael has had three books published: A-Z of Antiques and Auctions, 101 Antiques of the Future, and Collecting Under the Radar.

Works
"Michael Hogben: A-Z of Antiques and Auction" -
"101 Antiques of the future" (New Holland) 2007 
"Collecting Under the Radar: Tomorrow's Antiques" (Red Rock Press) American only-April 2009

References

 "Antiques show star opens auction house in Kent railway building". Kentnews.co.uk.

 "ONE life | Auction Man | Coronation Street". The Guardian.
 "TV auction star Michael Hogben 'hacking' victim". Folkestone Herald.

External links
 Personal website

1952 births
Living people
People from Folkestone
People from Hythe, Kent
Antiques experts
English television presenters
English auctioneers